The triakis truncated tetrahedral honeycomb is a space-filling tessellation (or honeycomb) in Euclidean 3-space made up of triakis truncated tetrahedra. It was discovered in 1914.

Voronoi tessellation 
It is the Voronoi tessellation of the carbon atoms in diamond, which lie in the diamond cubic crystal structure.

Being composed entirely of triakis truncated tetrahedra, it is cell-transitive.

Relation to quarter cubic honeycomb
It can be seen as the uniform quarter cubic honeycomb where its tetrahedral cells are subdivided by the center point into 4 shorter tetrahedra, and each adjoined to the adjacent truncated tetrahedral cells.

See also
Disphenoid tetrahedral honeycomb

References

Honeycombs (geometry)
Truncated tilings